The Santos-Dumont Demoiselle was a series of aircraft built in France by the Brazilian aviation pioneer Alberto Santos-Dumont. They were light-weight monoplanes with a wire-braced wing mounted above an open-framework fuselage built from bamboo. The pilot's seat was below the wing and between the main wheels of the undercarriage. The rear end of the boom carried a tailwheel and a cruciform tail. The name is a contraction of mademoiselle and is a synonym for "jeune fille"—young girl or woman—but also the common name in French for a Damselfly.

No. 19

The first aircraft of the type was the Santos-Dumont No. 19, which was built in 1907 to attempt to win the Grand Prix d'Aviation]] offered for a one kilometre closed-circuit flight.  Powered by a 15 kW (20 hp) air-cooled Dutheil & Chalmers flat-twin engine mounted on the leading edge of the wing, it had a wingspan of 5.1 m. (16 ft 9 in), was 8 m (26 ft 3 in) long and weighed only 56 kg (123 lb) including fuel. It had a pair of hexagonal rudders below the wing on either side of the pilot, a forward mounted hexagonal elevator in front of the pilot and a cruciform tail which, like the boxkite-style canard surfaces on the earlier 14-bis biplane of 1906, pivoted on a universal joint to function both as elevator and rudder mounted at the end of a substantial single boom.  There was no provision for lateral control.  The undercarriage consisted of a pair of wheels in front of the pilot and a third behind, supplemented by a tailskid.

Santos-Dumont made three flights on 17 November 1907 at Issy-les-Moulineaux.

Later, Santos-Dumont made a number of modifications: he repositioned the engine, placing it below the wing in front of the pilot, fitted a different propeller and removed the forward elevator and rudders.

No. 20
Santos-Dumont's next aircraft, the Demoiselle No. 20, was first flown in 1908, with an 18 kW (24-hp) Dutheil et Chalmers later replaced by a 22 kW (30 hp) Darracq-built liquid-cooled opposed twin engine of approximately 3.2-litre displacement.  The fuselage consisted of three bamboo tubes forming the primary longerons, of about 5 cm (2 in) diameter, connected by oval steel tubes.  For ease of transportation the bamboo tubes were divided into two sections, joined together by brass sockets.  The parallel-chord wings had two spars made of ash and bamboo ribs<ref name=FL1909> Santos-Dumont "Demoiselle" [[Flight International|Flight, 2 October 1909, pp. 603–6</ref> All versions had a pair of lightweight thin-tube radiators mounted under the wing, running the entire meter chord of the wing. It used wing warping, which had been patented by the Wright Brothers in 1906, for lateral control, operated from a transverse-pivoting joystick that would fit into a long, vertical pocket added to the jacket's back that the pilot would wear to fly the aircraft, "leaning into the turn" as either a bicycle rider would do for higher-velocity turns; or as Glenn Curtiss did with the transverse "rocking-cradle armrest" apparatus on the AEA June Bug in 1908. A similar system was used by Santos-Dumont in November 1906 to likewise operate the interplane ailerons on the final version of his Quatorze-bis (14 bis) pioneering canard biplane. The initial #20 Demoiselle's wing-warping arrangement also possessed control cabling that only pulled down alternately on the outer section of the rear wing spar with no "upwards" warp capability. 

The Demoiselle was the last aircraft built by Santos-Dumont. He performed flights with it in Paris, and made trips to nearby places. Flights were continued at various times through 1909, including a cross-country flight with stages of about 8 km (5  mi) from St. Cyr to Buc on 13 September 1909, returning the following day, and another on 17 September 1909 of 18 km in 16 min.  The aircraft was exhibited on the Clément-Bayard stand at the Paris Aéro Salon in October 1909 and it was announced that a production run of 100 aircraft was planned.  However, only 50 were actually built, of which only 15 were sold, at a price of 7,500 francs for each airframe.. It was offered with a choice of three engines: Clement 20 hp; Wright 4-cyl 30 hp (Clement-Bayard had the license to manufacture Wright engines); and Clement-Bayard 40 hp designed by Pierre Clerget. It achieved 120 km/h.

The French pioneer aviator Roland Garros learned to fly in a Demoiselle at a flight school established by Clement Bayard, and later flew one at Belmont Park, New York in 1910. The June 1910 edition of Popular Mechanics published drawings of the Demoiselle and wrote "This machine is better than any other which has ever been built, for those who wish to reach results with the least possible expense and with a minimum of experimenting." American companies sold drawings and parts of Demoiselle for several years thereafter. Santos-Dumont was so enthusiastic about aviation that he released the drawings of Demoiselle for nothing, thinking that aviation would be the cause of a new prosperous era for mankind; 300 copies were built in Europe and the USA. An example of a Demoiselle with a Darracq engine is preserved in the Musée de l'Air et de l'Espace. A flyable replica was built by Personal Plane Services Ltd for the 1965 film Those Magnificent Men in Their Flying Machines and others have been built since then. Examples are on display at the Le Bourget Paris Air and Space Museum, The Brooklands Museum in Weybridge, Surrey, England, The Old Rhinebeck Aerodrome in Red Hook, New York and others.

Specifications (No. 20)

References

Sources

External links

Demoiselle
1900s French experimental aircraft
Aircraft first flown in 1907
1910s French sport aircraft
Ultralight aircraft
High-wing aircraft
Single-engined tractor aircraft